Oshoek in Mpumalanga is the main border post between South Africa and Eswatini The N17 national road starts here. The area on the /Eswatini side of the border is known as Ngwenya, and the road (MR3 Road) leads directly to Mbabane, the Swazi capital city. The border is open between 07:00 and 00:00 local time daily.

References

Eswatini–South Africa border crossings